The 2019 Prudential RideLondon–Surrey Classic was a road cycling one-day race that took place on 4 August in London, England. It was the eighth edition of the London–Surrey Classic and was the thirtieth event of the 2019 UCI World Tour.

Defending champion Pascal Ackermann did not return to defend his title. In his absence, Elia Viviani took the win with Ackermann's teammate Sam Bennett coming in second. Viviani's teammate Michael Mørkøv held off Jasper Stuyven for the final podium place.

Teams
Twenty teams of up to seven riders participated in the race:

UCI WorldTeams

 
 
 
 
 
 
 
 
 
 
 
 
 
 
 
 

UCI Professional Continental teams

 
 
 

National Teams

 Great Britain

Results

References

External links

2019 UCI World Tour
2019 in British sport
August 2019 sports events in the United Kingdom
2019
2019 sports events in London